Polystomatidae is a family of flatworms belonging to the order Polystomatidea.

Genera

Genera:
 Apaloneotrema Du Preez & Verneau, 2020
 Aussietrema Du Preez & Verneau, 2020
 Concinnocotyla Pichelin, Whittington & Pearson, 1991

References

Platyhelminthes